John Daniel may refer to:

Animals
 John Daniel (gorilla) (1917–1922)
 John Daniel II (gorilla) (1920–1926)

People
 John Daniel (priest) (1745–1823), English Roman Catholic priest
 John Daniel (printer) (1755–1823), Welsh printer
 John Daniel (ship's captain), 17th-century English sea captain
 John A. Daniel (?–2011), American magician
 John Edward Daniel (1902–1962), Welsh theologian and chairman of the Welsh political party Plaid Cymru
 John Moncure Daniel (1825–1865), Virginia newspaper editor
 John Reeves Jones Daniel (1802–1868), U.S. Representative from North Carolina
 John W. Daniel (1842–1910), U.S. Senator from Virginia
 John Waterhouse Daniel (1845–1933), Canadian physician and Conservative politician
 John Daniel, a master founder at the Whitechapel Bell Foundry
 John Danyel or Daniel (1560s–1620s), musician from Somerset, England

See also
John Daniell (disambiguation)
John Daniels (disambiguation)
 Jack Daniel (disambiguation)